Adolphe Brezet was a French military officer who proclaimed himself as the President of the Free State of Counani in South America from 1904 to 1912.

Brezet was a mysterious figure who fought against the British in the Boer Wars of South Africa in the late 19th century before arriving in South America, and the Boer Republics had diplomatic relations with Brezet as a result.

According to contemporary sources, Counani consisted of a group of European adventurers that settled in a remote part of what is now the Brazilian state of Amapá. In order to boost speculation for investments, the men of Counani built fifty miles of railway tracks that led nowhere and had no trains running on them.

The ultimate fate of Brezet is entirely unknown, and Counani ceased to exist around the year 1912. It was ultimately a failed business venture, and never achieved recognized independence, or even much attention from Brazil.

See also
Republic of Independent Guyana

References
 Jordan, David Starr. The Days of a Man: Being Memories of a Naturalist, Teacher, and Minor Prophet of Democracy. Vol. 2, World Book Company, 1922.
  L'État libre de Counani ou l'expression d'une Guyane indépendante.
  An account of the two Republics of Counani and some of its postage stamps

French politicians
1900s in Brazil
19th-century French people
Amapá